The 2006 Continental Cup of Curling was a curling tournament held from November 23 to 26 in Chilliwack, British Columbia between six North American teams and six European teams. Europe defeated North America 229-171 after a series of North American losses in the skins games.

Teams
The teams representing this year's edition is as follows:

This tournament marks the first time a Finnish team has competed in the Continental Cup, as well as the first in which neither the rink of Randy Ferbey or Colleen Jones appeared (as Ferbey was defeated in the provincial playdowns did not qualify for the Brier and Jones did not win the Tournament of Hearts).  It is also the first time the winners of the Canada Cup of Curling is not awarded a berth in the Continental Cup (their positions being replaced by the teams representing Canada at the 2006 Olympic Winter Games instead).  The European team is captained by Elisabet Gustafson, who had competed in the inaugural Continental Cup.  The North American team is captained by Lindsay Sparkes and Linda Moore.

Mixed doubles
Teams are awarded six points for each victory in this match. If the match is tied after six ends, the two teams will each earn three points. 

The team format of mixed doubles in this Continental Cup and previous cups is different than from the team format used starting with the 2007 Continental Cup. In this team format, four players play on a team, and each player has one role only, throwing or sweeping. There are two throwers and two sweepers. The format of play is the same as it is in any cup. The players in each game are listed as such: (Thrower/Thrower, Sweeper/Sweeper).

Thursday, November 23, 12:30pm ET

Saturday, November 25, 6:00pm ET

Singles
Teams earn four points for each victory in this match.  If the match is tied through all events, the two teams will each earn two points.  An additional eight points will be awarded to the team with the higher aggregate score in this portion of the event.

The player listed played all of the shots; his/her teammates were sweepers or held the broom.

Friday, November 24, 5:00pm ET

North America wins the bonus points for having the higher aggregate total, 109-104.

Teams
Teams are awarded six points for each victory in the team match.  If the match is tied after 8 ends, the two teams will each earn three points.

Women
Thursday, November 23, 5:00pm ET

Friday, November 24, 12:30pm ET

Men
Thursday, November 23, 9:30pm ET

Friday, November 24, 9:30pm ET

Skins
In the skins portion of the event, teams get points that contribute to the overall score by scoring at least 2 points with the hammer or forcing a steal without.  The number of points is unevenly divided through each of the 8 ends in each of the 3 ends.

"A" Competition
Saturday, November 25, 1:30pm ET

"B" Competition
Saturday, November 25, 9:30pm ET

"C" Competition
Sunday, November 26, 12:30pm ET

Sunday, November 26, 1:30pm ET

References
Results from the World Curling Federation
Results from the Canadian Curling Association

Continental Cup Of Curling, 2006
Continental Cup of Curling
Sport in Chilliwack
2006 in Canadian curling
Curling in British Columbia
2006 in British Columbia